TransColorado Pipeline is a natural gas pipeline that transports gas across Colorado to either the San Juan Basin or Denver and the Colorado Interstate Gas system.  It is owned by Kinder Morgan Energy Partners.  Its FERC code is 143.

References

External links
Pipeline Electronic Bulletin Board

Natural gas pipelines in the United States
Energy infrastructure in Colorado
Kinder Morgan
Natural gas pipelines in Colorado